Nikolai Aleksandrovich Paklyanov (born 21 September 1986) is a former Russian professional football player.

Club career
He played in the Russian Football National League for FC Tekstilshchik-Telekom Ivanovo in 2007.

Skiing
Has level in skiing. Paklyanov became the bronze medalist of the championship of the Ivanovo region in skiing.

References

External links
 
 

1986 births
People from Ivanovo Oblast
Living people
Russian footballers
Russian male cross-country skiers
Association football defenders
FC Tekstilshchik Ivanovo players
FC Sheksna Cherepovets players
FC Spartak Kostroma players
Sportspeople from Ivanovo Oblast